He was one of the most remembered singer in Bolivia.He wrote over 20 songs. 

Ernesto Cavour Aramayo (9 April 1940 – 7 August 2022) was a Bolivian singer, musician, inventor of musical instruments, and author of Bolivian music teaching books. He was a founding member of the group Los Jairas.

In 2013, he received the Order of the Condor of the Andes.

He died on 7 August 2022, at the age of 82.

References

Further reading

External links
 
 

1940 births
2022 deaths
People from La Paz
20th-century Bolivian male singers
Bolivian songwriters
Los Jairas members